Celio Roberto Rodríguez da Silva (born September 20, 1969 in Paranaíba, Brazil) is a retired Brazilian and naturalized Salvadoran football player.

Club career
Rodríguez was born Célio Rodrigues in Brasil and played for several local teams in his early years before making the move to Mexican side Puebla. In 1992, he moved to El Salvador’s First Division League and launched a lengthy career with Luis Ángel Firpo with whom he would win 5 league titles and stay for 10 years, except for a season on loan to El Roble. In 1997, he was joint top goalscorer of the Primera División de Fútbol de El Salvador. He officially retired in 2001 although he still played a few games in 2002.

International career
A naturalized Salvadoran citizen, Rodríguez made his debut for El Salvador in an August 2000 friendly match against Haiti, but he failed to impress and got injured. The match in the end proved to be his only international game.

Retirement
Rodríguez retired in 2001 to become vicar of the church of Usulután, after he had studied theology during his football career.

Personal life
He is married to Karla Marina Sigüenza and they have one daughter together. His daughter's name is Camila Rodriguez.

Honours
Primera División de Fútbol de El Salvador: 5
 1995, 1996, 1997, Apertura 1998, Clausura 2000

References

External links
 Celio Rodríguez: entre el fútbol y Dios - El Diario de Hoy 
 ¿Cómo ve a Celio, profe?- El Diario de Hoy 

1969 births
Living people
People from Mato Grosso do Sul
Brazilian emigrants to El Salvador
Naturalized citizens of El Salvador
Association football forwards
Salvadoran footballers
El Salvador international footballers
CR Vasco da Gama players
Club Puebla players
C.D. Luis Ángel Firpo footballers